The Bakunawa is a serpent-like dragon in Philippine mythology. It is believed to be the cause of eclipses, earthquakes, rains, and wind. The movements of the Bakunawa served as a geomantic calendar system for ancient Filipinos and were part of the shamanistic rituals of the babaylan. It is usually depicted with a characteristic looped tail and a single horn on the nose. It was generally believed to be a sea serpent, but are also variously believed to inhabit either the sky or the underworld.

Due to increasing trade contacts with South Asia and the Indianization of Southeast Asia, the Bakunawa later became syncretized with the Nāga, Rahu, and Ketu of Hindu-Buddhist mythology.

Etymology

Bakunawa is believed to be originally a compound word meaning "bent snake", from Proto-Western-Malayo-Polynesian *ba(ŋ)kuq ("bent", "curved") and *sawa ("large snake", "python"). Spelling variants  include Vakonawa, Baconaua, or Bakonaua.

Historical accounts
"No. 42. When the moon is eclipsed, the Indians of various districts generally go out into the street or into the open fields, with bells, panastanes, etc. They strike them with great force and violence in order that they might thereby protect the moon which they say is being eaten or swallowed by the dragon, tiger, or crocodile. And the worst thing is that if they wish to say "the eclipse of the moon" it is very common in the Philippines to use this locution, saying "the dragon, tiger, or crocodile is swallowing the moon." The Tagalogs also make use of it and say, Linamon [ni] laho [ang] buwan [trans.: "Laho swallowed the moon"]."

Fr. Tomas Ortiz, Practica del Ministerio (1731) via Zuniga's Estadismo (1893)

Related myths
The Bakunawa is also sometimes known as Naga, from syncretization with the Hindu-Buddhist serpent deity, Nāga. It was also syncretized with the  Hindu-Buddhist navagraha pair, Rahu and Ketu, deities who were responsible for eclipses of the sun and moon, respectively.

Versions of the Bakunawa also existed in other myths in the Philippines, sharing the common theme of being the cause of eclipses. The most similar to the Bakunawa is the Tagalog Laho (derived from Rahu; also known as Nono or Buaya), a serpent-like dragon that causes moon eclipses. In Kapampangan mythology, Láwû is depicted as a bird-like dragon or serpent that causes both solar and lunar eclipses, however, its features are closer to the demon Rahu. Both the words laho and láwû mean "eclipse" (also in modern parlance "to disappear" or "to vanish") in the Tagalog and Kapampangan language.

Other mythical creatures related to the Bakunawa include the Hiligaynon Bawa, Bauta, or Olimaw; the Mandaya and Manobo Tambanakua; the Bagobo Minokawa; and the Maranao Arimaonga. However, these do not always appear serpent-like. The Maranao Arimaonga for example, is depicted as a lion-like dragon; while the Hiligaynon Olimaw is a winged serpent; the Bagobo Minokawa is a dragon-like giant bird; and the Mandaya Tambanokano and Manobo Tambanakua is a giant crab (sometimes also a giant tarantula or scorpion).

Mythology

Cebuano mythology

Tales about the Bakunawa say that it is the cause of eclipses. During ancient times, Pre-colonial Cebuanos believed that their supreme god, Bathala, created 7 moons to light up the sky. The Bakunawa, amazed by their beauty, would rise from the ocean and swallow the moons whole, angering Bathala and causing them to be mortal enemies.

To keep the moons from completely being swallowed by the Bakunawa, ancient Filipinos would go out of their homes with pans and pots, and would bang on them with great force to make noise in order to scare the Bakunawa into spitting out the moon back into the sky. Some of the people in the villages would play soothing sounds with their musical instruments, in hopes that the dragon would fall into a deep sleep. Thus, the brave men of the village hoped that while the dragon was hypnotized by the musical sounds they could somehow slay the dragon. Although the dragon was known as a "moon eater" it was also known as a "man eater".

Other tales tell that the Bakunawa has a sister in the form of a sea turtle. The sea turtle would visit a certain island in the Philippines in order to lay its eggs. However, locals soon discovered that every time the sea turtle went to shore, the water seemed to follow her, thus reducing the island's size. Worried that their island would eventually disappear, the locals killed the sea turtle.

When the Bakunawa found out about this, it arose from the sea and ate the moon. The people were afraid so they prayed to the supreme god to punish the creature. The god refused but instead told them to bang some pots and pans in order to disturb the serpent. The moon is  then regurgitated while the Bakunawa disappeared, never to be seen again.

Others tell how the Bakunawa fell in love with a human girl in one of the native tribes. The head of the tribe found out about their affair and had their house burned to ashes. The Bakunawa, finding out about this, became immersed in anger and tried to take revenge by eating all the 7 moons. When the Bakunawa was about to eat the last one, the supreme god took action and punished the Bakunawa by banishing it from its home away from the sea. It also tells that the reason of the eclipses is how the Bakunawa is trying to come back to its home and deceased family.

Some Filipino elders believe that Bakunawa is a moving island with communities mounted on its back, and that there are two classifications: the flying Bakunawa and the land Bakunawa.

West Visayan mythology

The story of Bakunawa and the Seven Moons was first documented in Mga Sugilanong Karaan 1913 by Buyser.  The story gained wider recognition when was published in 1926 as part of the Mga Sugilanong Pilinhon (Folk lore Filipino) collection where Buyser ends with his personal experience surrounding the belief in Bakunawa.

According to the ancient folks, when Bathala created the Moon[1], he created seven of it so that each would illuminate one night of the week[2]. The nights were bright and ever so beautiful because of these seven “Queens” who continuously shone in the night sky.

But the joy of the people on earth didn't last, and the beauty of the sky was no more when one night a terrifying creature, that coiled around the world like an evil serpent, as Saint John told about in Apocalipsis[3], envied the beautiful creations of the Almighty, and to the great dismay of the people on earth, swallowed 6 of the Moons. This serpent was named Bakunawa.

When Bathala saw the creature devouring all but one Moon, He planted bamboos on the remaining Moon. From afar, they looked like “stains” on the surface of the Moon.

To the people's despair at the loss of the 6 Stars*, they learned to heavily guard themselves so that the one last Moon would not be taken and destroyed by the frightening Serpent. One night the whole world panicked at the deafening scream of the people, the banging of drums among other objects that people could get a hold of to produce loud noise and sharp echoes as they saw the Moon being attacked by the Bakunawa. Children, big people, the elderly, women and men all cried:

“Return our Moon” among other unpleasant words. This was the only sound heard throughout the world that night. Cries and moans blended together, and took over the hearts of the people who feared that the world would end if they lost the only Moon they had left. The people came out of their houses and kneeled on the ground to pray that they would not be deprived of their Moon. It was a pity sight to behold that our brothers and sisters did not understand then what “Eclipse” was. The loud noises stopped as they saw the Bakunawa finally spit out the Moon.

The joy of the people at the return of the Moon could not be described that night. They lifted their hearts to the sky like flowers and uttered their praises of gratefulness to the Almighty who owned all creations.

Up to this time of progress, many still believed in the Bakunawa, and a lot still screamed: “Return our Moon”[4] and those in the mountainous regions and shores* still practiced this when an eclipse occurred. This was proven to us in the recent eclipses that had happened in our towns.

It was true what an old proverb said:

“The footprint of the old people never disappears.”

And this footprint was immortalized in the history of our City.

Damiana Eugenio published a reworked version of the myth in her collection, Philippine Folk Literature:The Myths released through University of the Philippines Press.

Bicolano mythology

In the Bicolano mythology, Bakunawa is a gigantic sea serpent deity of the deep and the underworld who is often considered as the cause of eclipses. 
Was once known to be a beautiful goddess who lived at the bottom of the sea, she was mesmerised by the light that was shining. She went up and saw the moon, so beautiful. However, the moon rejected her affection, so in return, she turned into a water dragon and tried to eat him instead. The moon's sister, Haliya, fought her off and caused the moon phases as well as eclipses in the process.

Literature
There is a short Hiligaynon song in 3/4 time that children used to sing during lunar eclipses:

Traditional art
Figures of the Bakunawa's head decorate the hilts of many ancient Filipino swords. These swords that originate in Panay are said to bestow upon the hangaway or mandirigma (sacred warriors) the fearful presence and power of the Bakunawa (or whatever deity/animal they have on their deity hilt) when they wield their swords in combat.

Games

A children's game called Bulan Bulan, Buwan Buwan, or Bakunawa is played in the Philippines. It has 6–8 players arranged in a  circle.

A player acts as the buwan/bulan (moon) while another player act as the Bakunawa (eclipse), chosen either through Jack-en-poy,  “maalis taya”, or “maiba taya.” The other participants stand in a circle facing the center and holding each other's hands. The buwan/bulan stands inside the circle while the Bakunawa stands outside.

Objective
The object of the game is for the Bakunawa to tag or touch the buwan/bulan. The rest of the players try to prevent the bakunawa from doing so by holding on to each other and running around the circle as fast as they can while not letting go of the ones next to them.

For the Bakunawa to get into the circle, he or she asks one of the players, "What chain is this?" and when the player replies, "This is an iron chain," the Bakunawa should ask another player because an iron chain is supposed to be unbreakable. A player who wants to let the bakunawa in can say, "This is an abaca chain," and should let go of his or her hold. This is usually done when the player playing as the bakunawa is tired from running around.

The malatikantumanlak can also try to get in by going under the linked hands. If the player chosen as the bakunawa is fast and small enough, this can be done easily. As soon as the bakunawa succeeds in getting in, the players forming the circle should let the buwan out of the circle.

The Bakunawa then tries to break out of the linked hands to try to get out to catch the buwan/bulan. When the Bakunawa succeeds in catching the buwan/bulan, they exchange places, or if both of them are too tired, another pair from the circle of players is chosen as the new Bakunawa and buwan/bulan.

Pop culture 
 The Bakunawa is a superweapon used by the main antagonist, Merga, in the video game, Freedom Planet 2, along with other creatures derived from Philippine culture.
 In the 2015 GMA Network show Alamat, Bakunawa is voiced by Tonipet Gaba in the episode: "Ang bakunawa at ang pitong buwan."
 In the mobile game EverWing, Bakunawa is one of the unlockable dragon sidekicks.
 Sisu the water dragon is a main character in the 2021 Disney animated film Raya and the Last Dragon.

See also
Coi Coi-Vilu
Horned Serpent
Makara
Batangas
Jormugandr
Leviathan

References

Children's games
Dragons
Sea serpents
Mythological aquatic creatures
Philippine legendary creatures
Philippine mythology
Tag variants
Visayan mythology